The trial of the Union for the Liberation of Ukraine was a court trial considered one of the show trials in the Soviet Union. 

The event took place in the Opera Theatre in Kharkiv (at that time the Ukrainian State Central Opera) from March 9 to April 19, 1930. Forty-five Ukrainian intellectuals, theologians, writers, and a librarian were accused of anti-state activities (or counter-revolutionary activities for some). Fifteen of the defendants worked in the organization of the All-Ukrainian Academy of Science. About thirty of them were members of former Ukrainian political parties. One was a former prime-minister while two others were ministers of the Ukrainian People's Republic. Finally, six were members of the Central Rada. Amongst those 45 defendants, two were of Jewish background and three were female. 

According to the Museum of Soviet Occupation, this proceeding became a sort of political slogan to persecute Ukraine's older and foremost academic intelligentsia, as well as representatives of the Ukrainian Autocephalous Orthodox Church (UAOC). According to one of the defendants, the Senior attorney of the secret department of Kyiv okrug department of GPU Solomon Bruk was repeating during the interrogations: "We must put the Ukrainian intelligentsia on its knees, it is our duty and it will be executed; those whom we would not be able [to subdue], we're going to shoot!" Soon after that, 700 other people were arrested in connection with the process. The total number is not known, but tens of thousands of people are estimated to have been arrested, exiled, and/or executed during and after the trial including 30,000 intellectuals, writers, teachers, and scientists.

Accusations

According to Soviet sources, the SVU was an underground organization which supposedly existed in Ukraine from June 1926 to July 1929, when it was exposed by the State Political Directorate. The SVU allegedly existed in the Ukrainian diaspora (it should not be confused with the Union of Liberation of Ukraine, which operated during World War II abroad). 

According to the indictment, the SVU put the task of liberation of the Ukrainian people in all ethnographic Ukrainian territory and the establishment of an independent Ukrainian Republic, which had to be parliamentary and democratic, with a broad right of citizens to private property. The indictment alleges that the SVU was preparing popular uprisings, in close agreement with leaders of Ukrainian diaspora. In addition, the Union of Ukrainian Youth (SUM) was to organize terrorist acts against the Soviet Union, and Soviet Ukrainian leaders.

List of the accused
Among others in the dock were:

 Serhiy Yefremov, an academician of the Ukrainian National Academy of Sciences, former deputy chairman of the Central Rada, and a member UPSF.
 Volodymyr Chekhivsky, former member of the Central Committee of USDRP, the Prime Minister of Ukraine, theologian, founder and administrator of the UAOC.
 V. Durdukivsky, a teacher, former member of UPSF.
 Yosyp Germaize, a historian, professor of Kyiv Institute of People's Education, former member USDRP.
 Andriy Nikovsky, a literary critic and writer, former member UPSF, and Foreign Minister UPR.
 Liudmyla Starytska-Chernyakhivska, a writer (former member UPSF) and a wife of the renowned scientist histology and  the professor of the Kyiv Medical Institute, Oleksandr Chernyakhivsky.
 Mykhailo Slabchenko, academician, historian, professor of the Odessa Institute of People's Education, former member USDRP.
 A. Hrebenetsky, teacher.
 Vsevolod Hantsov, philologist, the former member UPSF.
 H. Holoskevych, linguist, the associate of the Ukrainian National Academy of Sciences.
 Mykola Pavlushkov, student of the Kyiv Institute of People's Education, which Soviet authorities considered the founder of the Ukrainian Youth Association (CYM).

The Chairman of the Ukrainian Supreme Court who heard the case was Anton Prykhodko, the chief prosecutor M. Mykhailyk (Attorney-General of the Republic and Deputy Narkom). Among the public prosecutors were Panas Lyubchenko, academician A. Sokolovsky, writer O. Slisarenko. 

On the side of the defendants were Ratner, Vilensky, Puhtynsky. 

Among the defendants were three females: Liudmyla Starytska-Chernyakhivska, Liudmyla Bidnova, A. Tokarivska; two doctors - members UNAS, 15 professors of higher schools, two students, a director of a middle school, 10 teachers, a theologian and a priest of UAOC, three writers, five editors, two cooperators, two lawyers and a librarian; 15 defendants were employees of UNAS. Many defendants were united through political activities during the struggle for freedom (1917–1920): 31 of them were once members of the Ukrainian political parties (15 - UPSF, 12 - USDRP, 4 - UPSR), one was a prime minister, two - Ministers of the Ukrainian government, six - members of the Ukrainian Central Rada. According to the indictment act, 33 of the accused belonged to the Kyiv group of SVU, three represented Dnipropetrovsk and Odessa, two - Poltava and Mykolaiv, and a single representation was from Chernihiv and Vinnytsia. Among the defendants were two Ukrainians of Jewish ethnicity: a historian Yosyp Germaize and a lawyer Morhulis.

Process and verdict

The process had numerous inconsistencies. Leaders of the Ukrainian emigration strongly denied prosecutors' allegations that the emigration gave instructions to SVU. In particular, L. Chykalenko denied that he ever sent a letter of instruction to Yefremov.  The existence of such a letter was also denied by J. Hermayze.  N. Pavlushkova (sister of the defendant) argues that "SVU as an organization was the centre for a very narrow circle of people, not more than 12 - 15, without a strong organized periphery" and it recognized that the confessions at the trial of the defendants was forced.

Despite the Soviet SVU publicity process, the sentence was considered too moderate. According to K. Turkalo, one of the defendants, the prosecutor threatened 13 of the defendants with the Highest Degree of Penalty (death penalty), but did not demand it. 45 defendants were sentenced to 10 years of imprisonment in strict isolation, 6 to 8 years, 3 to 6 years, 10 to 5 years, 21 to 3 years and 1 to 2 years, 10 received a suspended sentence and were immediately released. 5 more were pardoned in a few months. Some prisoners had been sent to the Solovetsky Islands. In the 1930s and during the first months of World War II, many participants of the SVU were again arrested and disappeared. Most of the accused died in prison or in exile, only a few emigrated (K. Turkalo), and some were rehabilitated after World War II (V. Hantsov, V. Atamanovskyy).

In modern Ukrainian opinion, the dominant thought is that SVU and SUM did not exist as organizations, and were provocations of the GPU (V. Holubnychyy, V. Hryshko, M. Kowalewsky, G. Kostyuk, Yu. Lavrinenko, R. Sallivant, K. Turkalo, P. Fedak), however some sources recognize the existence of SVU (N. Pavlushkova, W. Ivy). 

The hypothesis that SVU - SUM was a fictitious organization of the GPU is supported by the existence of other show trials (Shakhty process in 1928 or the so-called Prompartia (Industrial Party) in December 1930), which were purely political. 

It is more probable that the defendants in the SVU process were Ukrainian patriots, who actively worked for the Ukrainian national cultural renaissance in the 1920s, but they did so spontaneously, without creating any anti-Soviet political organization, with no directive from the Ukrainian emigration.

See also
 Union for the Liberation of Ukraine
 The Executed Renaissance

References

Further reading
 Lubchenko P. With the Warsaw Pact against the five-year plan (the process of SVU). Kharkiv, 1930. Любченко П. З Варшавським договором проти п'ятирічки (до процесу СВУ). X. 1930;
 Central Komsomol Committee of Ukraine. Young fascists of the Ukrainian counterrevolution (art. of Mr. Liubchenko and others). Kharkiv, 1930. Центр. Комітет ЛКСМ України. Молоді фашисти укр. контрреволюції (ст. п. Любченка та ін.). X. 1930;
 Skrypnyk M. Counterrevolutionary sabotage on the cultural front. Chervonyi Shliakh, part 4. Kharkiv, 1930. Скрипник М. Контрреволюційне шкідництво на культурному фронті, ж. Червоний Шлях, ч. 4. 1930;
 Skrypnyk M. Society for the Liberation of Ukraine (SVU). Bolshevik of Ukraine, part 8. Kharkiv, 1930. Скрипник М. Спілка Визволення України, ж. Більшовик України, ч. 8. X. 1930;
 Office of Prosecutor General of the Ukrainian SSR. Accusing conclusion in the affair of the counterrevolutionary organization of the Society for the Liberation of Ukraine (by the accused S.Yefremov, V.Chekhivsky, A.Nikovsky etc.). Kharkiv, 1930. Прокуратура УРСР. Винувальний висновок у справі контррев. оргції Спілка Визволення України (за винуваченням С. Єфремова, В. Чехівського, А. Ніковського та ін.). X. 4. 2. 1930;
 The Declaration of the CC USDRP (of March 25, March 29, March 30 and April 9) D.Doroshenko and L. Chykalenko. At a margin of the process of SVU in Kharkiv. Newspaper Dilo. Lviv, 1930. Деклярація ЦК УСДРП (від 25. 3, 29. 3, 30. 3 і 9. 4) Д. Дорошенка і Л. Чикаленка. На марґінесі процесу СВУ у Харкові, вміщена в газ. Діло. Л. 1930; 
 Society for the Liberation of Ukraine. Stenographic record of the trial, vol.1. Kharkiv, 1931. Спілка Визволення України. Стенографічний звіт судового процесу, т. І. X. 1931;
 Kowalewski, M. Ukraine under the Red Yoke: documents, facts. Vienna - Lviv, 1937. Ковалевський М. Україна під червоним ярмом: документи, факти. В. — Л. 1937; 
 Turkalo K. Forty-five. Memories of the trial SVU of nine. April 3–20, 1930. New Days magazine 34 — 35. Toronto 1952, 36 - 40, 1953. Туркало К. Сорок п'ять. Спогади з судового процесу СВУ 9. 3. — 20. 4.  1930, ж. Нові Дні, чч. 34 - 35. Торонто 1952, 36 — 40, 1953; 
 Lawrinenko J. Ukrainian Communism and Soviet Russian Policy Toward the Ukraine: An Annotated Bibliography. 1917 - 1953. New York 1953;
 Manning CA. Ukraine under the Soviets. New York 1953;
 Society for the Liberation of Ukraine, collection I. Munich 1953; Спілка Визволення України, зб. І. Мюнхен 1953; 
 Pavlushkova N. My word about the process of SVU and SUM (sadness). New Days magazine, page 49 - 51. Toronto 1954. Павлушкова Н. Моє слово про процес СВУ та СУМ. ж. Нові Дні, ч. 49 — 51. Торонто 1954; 
 Fedak P., Mazepa,I. Fighter for the freedom of Ukraine. Nashe Slovo. London, 1954. Феденко П. Ісаак Мазепа. Борець за волю України, Наше Слово. Лондон 1954; 
 Hryshko V. Experience with Russia. New-York, 1956.
 Kostiuk H. Stalinist Rule in the Ukraine. New York, 1960.
 Sullivant S. Soviet Politics and the Ukraine 1917 — 1957. New York, 1962.
 Павлушкова Н. Спілка Визволення України й Спілка Укр. Pavlushkova N. Union for the Liberation of Ukraine and the Union of Russia. Молоді (спогади) газ. Young (memories) gas. Канадійський Фармер. Canadian Farmer. Вінніпеґ 4. Winnipeg 4. 3. 3. — 24. - 24. 10. 10. 1963; 1963;
 Holubnychy V. History of the Ukrainian Soviet Socialist Republic 1917 — 41 in Ukraine. A Concise Encyclopedia, Vol. I. Toronto, 1963.
 Туркало К. Спілка Визволення України (до сорокових роковин), ж. K. Turkalo Union for the Liberation of Ukraine (up to fortieth anniversary), the same. Нові Дні, чч. New Days chch. 237 — 239. 237 - 239. Торонто 1969; Toronto 1969;
 Плющ В. Боротьба за українську державу під совєцькою владою. Ivy V. The struggle for the Ukrainian state under sovyetskoyu authorities. Лондон 1973. London 1973.
 Енциклопедія українознавства (у 10 томах) / Головний редактор Володимир Кубійович . — Париж, Нью-Йорк: «Молоде Життя», 1954—1989 . (укр.) Encyclopedia of Ukraine (in 10 volumes) / Editor in Chief Vladimir Kubiiovych. - Paris, New York: Young Life, 1954-1989. (RUS)

External links
 Web-site of SUM
 Vilisov, V. ''Union for the Freedom of Ukraine case (SVU): How was taken out the true elite of our country. Argumentua from The New Times.
 Union for the Liberation of Ukraine at the Encyclopedia of Ukraine.

 
1930s in Ukraine
Trials in Ukraine
Political and cultural purges
Soviet law
Soviet show trials
History of Kharkiv
1930 in law
Anti-Ukrainian sentiment
Political repression in Ukraine
Crimes of the communist regime in Ukraine against Ukrainians
Stalinism in Ukraine